The 2000 Ohio Valley Conference men's basketball tournament was the postseason men's basketball tournament of the Ohio Valley Conference during the 1999–2000 NCAA Division I men's basketball season. It was held February 29 – March 5, 2000. The first round was hosted by the higher seeded team in each game. The semifinals and finals took place at Gaylord Entertainment Center in Nashville, Tennessee. Two seed Southeast Missouri State won the tournament, defeating Murray State in the championship game, and received the Ohio Valley's automatic bid to the NCAA tournament. Southeast Missouri State drew a 13 seed in the West region, facing the 4 seed LSU.

Format
The top eight eligible men's basketball teams in the Ohio Valley Conference receive a berth in the conference tournament.  After the 18-game conference season, teams were seeded by conference record.  and  did not participate due to their respective 9th and 10th place conference finishes.

Bracket

References

Tournament
Ohio Valley Conference men's basketball tournament
Basketball competitions in Nashville, Tennessee
College sports tournaments in Tennessee
Ohio Valley Conference men's basketball tournament
Ohio Valley Conference men's basketball tournament
Ohio Valley Conference men's basketball tournament